Roger  is a masculine given name, and a surname. The name was introduced into England by the Normans. In Normandy, the Frankish name had been reinforced by the Old Norse cognate . The name introduced into England replaced the Old English cognate . Roger became a very common given name during the Middle Ages. A variant form of the given name Roger that is closer to the name's origin is Rodger.

Slang and other uses

In Under Milk Wood, Dylan Thomas writes "jolly, rodgered" suggesting both the sexual double entendre and the pirate term "Jolly Roger".

In 19th-century England, Roger was slang for another term, the cloud of toxic green gas that swept through the chlorine bleach factories periodically.

From circa 1940 in US and UK wartime communication, "Roger" came to represent "R" when spelling out a word. "R" is the first letter in "received", used to acknowledge understanding a message. This spread to civilian usage as "ROGER" replaced "received" in spoken usage in air traffic radio parlance by 1950.

Current British slang includes the word as a verb to mean sexual intercourse, i.e., "took her home and Rogered her."

Spellings 

The following forenames are related to the English given name Roger:
 
 Alt.

People

Given name

Medieval period 

Kings and rulers 
 Hrothgar, semi-legendary Danish king living around the early sixth century AD
 Roger I of Sicily, Norman ruler of Sicily
 Roger II of Sicily (1095–1154), Norman King of Sicily and Africa, one of the principal commanders of Second Crusade
 Roger III of Sicily (1175–1193), briefly King of Sicily

Others 
 Roger, Archbishop of Patras (in post 1337–1347)
 Roger (Archdeacon of Barnstaple) (in post from 1155)
 Roger (archbishop of Benevento) (died 1221)
 Roger (bishop of Ross) (died c. 1350)
 Roger (larderer) (died 1102), Bishop-elect of Hereford
 Roger Borsa (1060/61–1111), Norman Duke of Apulia and Calabria
 Roger (son of Dagobert), Norman magnate who served the Byzantine empire
 Roger I. de Sentes, 12th century French bishop
 Roger I Trencavel (died 1150), Viscount of Carcassonne
 Roger I de Fézensaguet (1190–1245), Viscount of Fézensaguet
 Roger I of Carcassonne (died 1012), Count of Carcassonne
 Roger I of Tosny (died ), Norman nobleman
 Roger II Trencavel (died 1194), Viscount of Carcassonne
 Roger III, Duke of Apulia (1118–1148), Duke of Apulia, Sicily
 Roger IV, Count of Foix (died 1265)
 Roger IV, Duke of Apulia (1152–1161)
 Roger of Lauria (c. 1245–1305), Italian admiral
 Roger Bacon, English philosopher
 Roger Bigod of Norfolk (died 1107), Norman knight who participated in the Norman Conquest of England
 Roger Frugardi, Salernitan surgeon
 Roger Mortimer, 4th Earl of March (1374–1398)
 Roger Niger (c. 1173–1241), Bishop of London
 Roger Norreis (died c. 1224), Abbot of Evesham
 Roger of Salisbury (died 1139), also known as Roger le Poer, Norman Bishop of Salisbury and Lord Chancellor and Lord Keeper of England
 Roger of Worcester from 1163 to 1179

Modern era 
 Roger (footballer, born 1972), Roger José de Noronha Silva, Brazilian football goalkeeper
 Roger (footballer, born 1978), Roger Galera Flores, Brazilian football attacking midfielder
 Roger (footballer, born 1985), Roger Rodrigues da Silva, Brazilian football manager and former player
 Roger (footballer, born 1996), Roger Junio Rodrigues Ferreira, Brazilian football midfielder
 Roger Adams, American Nobel Prize organic chemist
 Roger Ailes, American television executive, chairman and CEO of Fox News
 Roger Angell (1920–2022), American writer and editor for The New Yorker
 Roger Ashton (footballer), Welsh footballer
 Roger Avary, Canadian producer, screenwriter and director
 Roger Ballen, American artist working in South Africa
 Roger Bannister, British athlete, first man to run the four-minute mile
 Roger "Syd" Barrett, founder of Pink Floyd
 Roger Bart, American actor and singer
 Roger Berrio, Colombian weightlifter
 Roger Binny, Indian cricketer
 Roger Joseph Boscovich, Croatian-Ragusan physicist, astronomer, mathematician, philosopher, diplomat, poet, and Jesuit
 Roger Boylan, American writer
 Roger Buckley (1937–2020), American historian
 Roger Bumpass (born 1951), American voice actor
 Roger Burnley (born 1966), British businessman, former CEO of Asda
 Roger C. Carmel, American character actor
 Roger A. Caras, American wildlife photographer and writer
 Roger Carter (disambiguation), multiple people
 Roger Casement, Irish patriot, poet, revolutionary, and British diplomat
 Roger Chaffee, American astronaut
 Roger Chan, the bus uncle
 Roger Chao, Australian explorer and mountain climber
 Roger Christian (songwriter) (1934–1991), American radio personality and songwriter
 Roger Clarke (rugby union administrator), British rugby administrator
 Roger Clemens, baseball player
 Roger Cook (journalist), British journalist
 Roger Corman, American film director, producer, and actor
 Roger Craig (baseball), baseball player
 Roger Craig (American football), American football player
 Roger Craig Smith (born 1975), American voice actor
 Roger Daltrey, lead singer of British rock band The Who
 Roger Davis (television actor), American actor
 Roger O. DeBruler (1934–2017), Justice of the Indiana Supreme Court
 Roger Delgado, British actor
 Roger Dobkowitz, American television producer, statistics expert for The Price is Right
 Roger Donaldson, New Zealand filmmaker
 Roger Ebert (1942–2013), American film critic and writer
 Roger M. Enoka, American neurophysiologist
 Roger Federer, Swiss tennis player
 Roger W. Ferguson, Jr., American CEO and former Federal Reserve official
 Roger C. Field, British inventor and industrial designer
 Roger Fortin, Canadian boxer
 Roger Frampton, Australian jazz musician
 Roger García Junyent, Spanish football player
 Roger Gibbon, Trinidad and Tobago track cyclist
 Roger Glover, Welsh/English bassist, keyboardist, songwriter, and record producer
 Roger Godement, French mathematician
 Roger Goldammer, Canadian bikebuilder
 Roger Goodell, commissioner of the NFL
 Roger Guerreiro, Polish football player of Brazilian descent
 Roger Hall (disambiguation), several people
 Roger Hamby (born 1943), American racing car driver
 Roger Hodgman, Australian stage and television director
 Roger Hodgson, British vocalist and songwriter from Supertramp
 Roger Howarth, American actor
 Roger Ilegems, Belgian track cyclist and road bicycle racer
 Roger Ingram, American trumpeter, educator, and author
 Roger Jackson (rower), Canadian rower and academic
 Roger Jackson (wide receiver), American football player
 Roger L. Jackson, American actor
 Roger Jouret, birth name of Plastic Bertrand, Belgian singer, musician and television presenter
 Roger Kettlewell, Canadian football player
 Roger Keyes, 1st Baron Keyes, Royal Navy officer prominent in World War I, and Member of Parliament
 Roger Kibbe (1939–2021), American serial killer
 Roger Köppel, Swiss journalist
 Roger Machado Marques, Brazilian football player
 Roger Lloyd-Pack, British actor
 Rogério Manganelli, Brazilian-American bass guitarist for Less Than Jake, known as Roger Lima
 Roger Manvell, first director of the British Film Academy
 Roger Maris, baseball player
 Roger Mason Jr, American basketball player
 Roger Mayweather (1961–2020), American boxer
 Roger McCreary (born 2000), American football player
 Roger McGuinn, American singer-songwriter, guitarist for The Byrds
 Roger McMurrin, American conductor
 Roger Michell (1956–2021), South African-born British film director
 Roger Milla, Cameroon footballer
 Roger Miller, American musician
 Roger Mills (racewalker), English race walker
 Roger Moore, English actor, James Bond
 Roger Moreira, Brazilian musician
 Roger Moret (1949–2020), Puerto Rican baseball player
 Roger E. Mosley, American actor
 Roger Mudd (1928–2021), American TV journalist
 Roger Muñoz, Nicaraguan basketball player
 Roger Myerson, American economist and professor
 Roger Penrose, English mathematical physicist
 Roger Penske, American businessman
 Roger Tory Peterson, American ornithologist
 Roger Pierre (1923–2010), French actor
 Roger Price (comedy) (1918–1990), American humorist who created Droodles and Mad Libs
 Roger Price (television producer) (born 1941), English television producer
 Roger Price (Australian politician) (born 1945), Labor member of the Australian House of Representatives (1984–2010)
 Roger Rees, British actor
 Roger Roger (composer), French composer
 Roger Rose (born 1958), American actor
 Roger Rogerson, former detective of the NSW Police Force and convicted murderer
 Roger Sablonier (1941–2010), Swiss historian and writer
 Brother Roger (1915–2005), baptised Roger Louis Schutz-Marsauche, Swiss initiator of the Taizé community
 Roger Scruton (1944–2020), English philosopher and writer
 Roger Sessions, American music composer
 Roger Hale Sheaffe, British general, one of the principal commanders of War of 1812
 Roger Sheaffe (politician), member of the Queensland Legislative Assembly
 Roger Sherman, American revolutionary, signer of many famous documents, inventor of congressional system, one of the Founding Fathers of the United States
 Roger Smith (actor), American actor
 Roger Smith (executive) (1925–2007), American chairman and CEO of General Motors and the subject of Michael Moore's documentary film Roger & Me
 Roger Spink (born 1958), Falkland Islands politician
 Roger Dale Stafford (1951–1995), American convicted spree killer and serial killer
 Roger Staubach, American football player
 Roger Stone, American political lobbyist, strategist, and author
 Roger Sumich, New Zealand cyclist
 Roger Taylor, British drummer for Queen
 Roger Taylor, British drummer for Duran Duran
 Roger Toussaint, American transit worker's union official
 Roger Troutman (1951–1999), also known as Roger, American R&B recording artist, singer for Zapp
 Roger Tuivasa-Sheck (born 1993), New Zealand rugby player
 Roger Vadim, French film director
 Roger Vangheluwe, Belgian bishop, resigned following pedophilia scandal
 Roger Waters, English rock musician and songwriter
 Roger Whittaker (born 1936), British singer
 Roger Wicker (born 1951), U.S. Senator from Mississippi
 Roger Williams (pianist) (1924–2011), American pianist
 Roger Williams (theologian) (1603–1683), English minister, theologian, and author, co-founder of Rhode Island
 Roger Williams (soldier) (1539/40–1595), Welsh soldier of fortune and military theorist, one of the principal commanders of Eighty Years' War and Battle of Arques
 Roger L. Worsley, American educator
 Roger Wrightson, English cricketer
 Roger Arliner Young (1899–1964), American scientist, first African American woman to earn a PhD in Zoology
 Roger Zelazny, American science-fiction author

Surname 
 Neil Munroe Bunny Roger (1911–1997), English couturier, war hero
 Charles Rogier, Belgian liberal statesman and a leader in the Belgian Revolution, Prime Minister of Belgium 1847–1852 and 1857–1868
 Christophe Roger-Vasselin (born 1957), French former tennis player, father of Édouard
 Dimitri Roger, American rapper known as Rich the Kid
 Édouard Roger-Vasselin (born 1983), French tennis player, son of Christophe
 Julius Roger (1819–1865), German entomologist and medical doctor
 Marie-Sabine Roger (born 1957), French writer
 Mircea Roger (born 1947), Romanian Olympic rower
 Pierre Roger, birth name of Pope Clement VI
 Roger Roger (composer) (1911–1995), French composer

Fictional characters 

 Gold Roger (Gol D. Roger), the Pirate King in the manga/anime-series One Piece
 Lord Rogers, a character from The Swan Princess (film series)
 Roger (American Dad!), protagonist of the animated sitcom American Dad!
 Roger, in the short story "Thank You, Ma'am" by Langston Hughes
 Roger, a jolly prankster of the Burger Palace Boys from the hit 50s musical Grease
 Roger the Dodger, from The Beano
 Roger (Guilty Gear)
 Roger (Hellboy), a homunculus from the series Hellboy
 Roger, a pseudocharacter in Monty Python's Life of Brian whom the crowd wanted Pontius Pilate to release to make fun of his lisp ("Welease Woger".)
 Roger, a character in the novel Lord of the Flies, Jack's lieutenant and the tribe's torturer/hangman
 Roger (Tekken), a kangaroo character from the Tekken fighting game series, and Roger Jr., his son
 Roger Ackroyd, title character of Agatha Christie's novel The Murder of Roger Ackroyd
 Roger Brook secret agent and Napoleonic Wars Era gallant in a series of novels by Dennis Wheatley
 Roger Chillingworth, the antagonist in Nathaniel Hawthorne's novel The Scarlet Letter
 Roger Danish, a minor character in Arrested Development, Lindsey's high school counterpart and co-winner of the Best Hair Award
 Roger Baxter, Blythe Baxter's father and supporting character in the cartoon Littlest Pet Shop
 Roger Davis (Rent), musician and ex-druggie of Rent
Roger De Bris, director-turned-actor in The Producers and its musical version
 Roger Fox, from the comic strip FoxTrot
 Roger Healey, captain/major played by Bill Daily in the I Dream of Jeannie 1960's sitcom
 Roger Hoyt, the main character on the short-lived series Life with Roger
 Roger Klotz, a bully on the cartoon series Doug
 Roger Latimer, a character in the 1987 American comedy movie Revenge of the Nerds II: Nerds in Paradise
 Monsieur Roger LeClerc, in the BBC sitcom 'Allo 'Allo!
 Roger MacKenzie, character in Diana Gabaldon's Outlander series, portrayed by Richard Rankin in the TV adaptation 
 Roger Murtaugh, cop played by Danny Glover in the Lethal Weapon movies
 Roger Piazza, a supporting character from Max & Ruby
 Roger Rabbit, cartoon character from the 1988 film Who Framed Roger Rabbit
 Roger Radcliffe, in Disney's animated film 101 Dalmatians
 Roger Radcliffe, in The Life and Times of Juniper Lee
 Roger Ramjet, cartoon superhero
 Roger Samms, the protagonist in the Bad Mojo
 Roger Smith, the main protagonist of the anime series The Big O
 Roger Sterling, co-owner of the advertising company Sterling Cooper, a character in the television series Mad Men
 Roger the Shrubber, a character in Monty Python and the Holy Grail who sells a shrubbery to King Arthur and Sir Bedevere
 Roger Walker, one of the central protagonists in the Swallows and Amazons series by Arthur Ransome
 Roger Wilco, protagonist of the Space Quest game series

Animal

 Roger (kangaroo), Australian kangaroo with an extraordinary physique, aka "Ripped Roger" (circa 2006 – 2018)

See also 
 Roger Dodger (phrase)
 Roger-Vasselin (disambiguation)
 Roger (voice procedure)
 Ruggiero (character)
 Raja (similarly pronounced in some accents)

Citations

References 

 
 
 

English masculine given names
French masculine given names
German masculine given names
Scottish masculine given names
Surnames from given names